Mount Bishop is a mountain named in 1918 after W.A. "Billy" Bishop VC who was a Colonel and a Canadian fighter pilot awarded the Victoria Cross during World War I. It is located in the Elk Range of the Canadian Rockies and sits on the Continental Divide, which forms the British Columbia-Alberta border in this area.

See also
List of peaks on the Alberta–British Columbia border

References

Two-thousanders of Alberta
Two-thousanders of British Columbia
Great Divide of North America
Canadian Rockies